William Capers "Doc" Bass (December 4, 1898 – December 12, 1970) was a professional baseball player. He appeared in two games in Major League Baseball for the Boston Braves in 1918, once as a pinch hitter and once as a pinch runner.

In his major league career, Bass had one at bat, in which he singled. He also scored a run and stole a base, although he never appeared in the field. After the 1918 season, Bass continued to play minor league baseball until 1925, primarily as an outfielder.

Sources

Baseball outfielders
Boston Braves players
Spartanburg Pioneers players
Columbia Comers players
Okmulgee Drillers players
Mercer Bears baseball players
Augusta Georgians players
Augusta Tygers players
Blytheville Tigers players
Baseball players from Georgia (U.S. state)
Sportspeople from Macon, Georgia
1898 births
1970 deaths
United States Army personnel of World War I